Pringsheim is a Jewish Silesian surname. Notable people with the surname include:

 Alfred Pringsheim (1850–1941), mathematician, father-in-law of writer Thomas Mann
 Ernst Pringsheim Sr. (1859–1917), German physicist
 Ernst Pringsheim Jr. (1881–1970), German botanist
 Klaus Pringsheim Sr. (1883–1972), German composer, conductor, twin brother of Katharina Pringsheim
 Nathanael Pringsheim (1823–1894), German botanist